Events in the year 1848 in Chile.

Incumbents
President: Manuel Bulnes

Events

February
8 February - The Treaty of Lima is signed.

Births
date unknown - Francisco de Borja Echeverría (died 1904)
5 February - Ignacio Carrera Pinto (died 1882)
April 3 - Arturo Prat (died 1879)
November 16 - Rafael Sotomayor Gaete (died 1918)

Deaths
17 December - José María Urrutia Manzano (born 1771)